The Volvo PV 36 Carioca is a luxury car manufactured by Volvo Cars between 1935 and 1938. The word Carioca describes someone from Rio de Janeiro, Brazil, and was also the name of a dance that was fashionable in Sweden at the time when the car was introduced.

Visually the car was styled similarly to the then strikingly modern Chrysler Airflow and Hupmobile Model J Aero-dynamic.  Volvo styling was heavily influenced by North American auto-design trends in the 1930s and 1940s, many of the company's senior engineers having previously worked in the US Auto-industry.

The PV36 was the first Volvo to offer an independent front suspension, but the car used the same side-valve engine as the traditional Volvo cars that were still produced alongside the modern Carioca. The PV36 was an expensive car, with a price at 8,500 kronor and Volvo didn't build more than 500 cars. The last one wasn't sold until 1938.

References
Volvo Personvagnar-från 20-tal till 80-tal by Björn-Eric Lindh, 1984.

Notes

External links 
Volvo Cars Heritage.
Volvo Museum.
Storvolvoklubben 

PV 36 Carioca
Luxury vehicles
Sedans
Rear-wheel-drive vehicles
Cars introduced in 1935
1930s cars
Streamline Moderne cars